The Okaw Valley Conference was a high school athletic conference in the Illinois High School Association (IHSA), based in Central Illinois. The conference consisted of medium-sized and small high schools. It merged with the Corn Belt Conference to form the Illini Prairie Conference in the 2017-18 school year.

History
The Okaw Valley Conference was formed in the early 1950s. It originally consisted of Arcola, Arthur, Atwood-Hammond, Bement, Cerro Gordo, Monticello, Newman, Oakland, Sullivan, Tuscola, and Villa Grove.  Tolono Unity was added in 1958. In 1971, the smallest seven schools left to form the Little Okaw Valley, and three schools were added: Decatur St Teresa, St Joseph-Ogden, and Warrensburg-Latham. In 1976, Arcola left and Mahomet-Seymour replaced them. In 1982, Sullivan and Warrensburg-Latham left and Argenta-Oreana was added. Tuscola dropped out in 1983. The league folded after the 1984 season.

In 1990 Argenta-Oreana, Clinton, St Teresa, Monticello, Sullivan, and Warrensburg-Latham resurrected the conference, and in 1995, Meridian and Maroa-Forsyth were added. Central A&M joined in 1997, Shelbyville in 1999, and Tuscola and Unity in 2006. The conference was split into two divisions for football in 2006. The Black Division consisted of Clinton, Monticello, Shelbyville, St. Teresa, Sullivan, and Unity. The Blue Division consisted of Argenta-Oreana, Central A&M, Maroa- Forsyth, Meridian, Tuscola, and Warrensburg-Latham. Each team played the five schools from their division, and then four from the other division.

In 2012, 9 teams officially left the Okaw and started a new conference called the Central Illinois Conference (CIC).  These schools were Argenta-Oreana, Clinton, St. T, Meridian, Central A&M, Sullivan, Shelbyville, Warrensburg-Latham, and Tuscola.  Three teams were left out of the new conference.  These teams were Monticello, Tolono, and Maroa-Forsyth.  Before the actual forming of the CIC, Argenta-Oreana decided to join the Little Okaw Valley Conference. The Okaw Valley Conference continued with Monticello, Tolono-Unity, Champaign St. Thomas More, St. Joseph-Ogden, and Rantoul.

Maroa-Forsyth High School left the conference for the Sangamo Conference after the 2015-16 school year. In April 2016, school boards of the remaining five schools and the school boards of the five schools in the Corn Belt Conference voted unanimously to merge into a new Illini Prairie Conference beginning in the 2017-18 school year.

Member schools

Sports
The conference offers the following sports:

Boys sports
 Football, basketball, baseball, track and field (all schools)
 Soccer (Monticello, Unity, Maroa-Forsyth/Warrensburg-Latham Co-op)
 Golf (all schools except Unity)
 Cross-country 
 Wrestling (Monticello, Unity, Argenta-Oreana/Maroa-Forsyth Co-op)

Girls sports
 Volleyball, basketball, softball (all schools)
 Soccer (Monticello, Maroa-Forsyth/Warrensburg-Latham Co-op)
 Cross-country (all schools, Maroa-Forsyth/Warrensburg-Latham Co-op)
 Track and field (all schools except Maroa-Forsyth/Warrensburg-Latham Co-op)
 Competitive cheering (all schools except Unity)
 Golf

Notable accomplishments

Successes
 Argenta-Oreana: Girls Cross Country: 3rd place in 1992–93 & 2001–02
 Central A&M- Boys Football: 1st place 1997, 2nd place in 2001. Girls Basketball: 3rd place in 2007–08
 Clinton: Boys Golf: 2nd place 1996–97. Boys Wrestling: 3rd place 1989–90, 2nd place 1992–93, 4th place 1993–94, 2nd place 1999–2000, 3rd place 2000–01
 Maroa-Forsyth: Boys Football: 1st place 2006, 2nd place 2009. Boys Basketball: 1st place 2006–07 (only the second school in Illinois history to win a championship in both Football and Basketball in same year), 3rd place 2005–06. Girls Golf: 3rd place 2000–01, 2nd place 2001–02 & 2002–03. Girls Volleyball: 3rd place 2007–08
 Meridian: Boys Basketball: 1st place 2008–09. Boys Football: 2nd place 1999
 St. Teresa: Girls Cross Country won state in 2010. Girls tennis: 2nd in doubles in state in 2009
 Shelbyville: Competitive Cheering: 1st place 2005–06
 Sullivan: Boys Baseball: 2nd place 1997–98. Boys Golf: 3rd place 1979–80. Girls Basketball: 1st place 1990–91, 2nd place 1991–92. Scholastic Bowl: 4th place 1992–93 & 2000–01
 Tuscola: Boys Football: 1st place 2006–07 & 2009–10, 2nd place 2007–08, 2010–11, 2011-12. Boys Baseball: 4th place 2007–08, 2nd place 2011-12. Boys Track: 3rd place 2007–08. Girls Softball: 4th place 2011-12.
 Unity: Boys Football: 2nd place 2009–10. Girls Volleyball: 4th place 1977–78, 3rd place 1980–81, 2nd place 1978–79 and 2008–09
 Warrensburg-Latham: Boys Basketball: 3rd place 2002–03 & 2007–08. Girls Softball: 2nd place 2003–04. Scholastic Bowl: 1st place 2000–01, 3rd place 2008–09

References

External links
 http://www.illinoishsglorydays.com
 http://www.ihsa.com

Illinois high school sports conferences